100 Lovers is the sixth studio album by American indie folk band DeVotchKa. It was released by Anti- Records on February 28, 2011.

Release
The first music video "100 Other Lovers" was released on February 3, 2011, and directed by Chloe Rodham.

Devotchka released the music video to "All the Sand in All the Sea" on their official YouTube on February 15, 2011.

Critical reception

100 Lovers was met with "generally favorable" reviews from critics. At Metacritic, which assigns a weighted average rating out of 100 to reviews from mainstream publications, this release received an average score of 72 based on 18 reviews. At AnyDecentMusic?, the album was given a 6.4 out of 10 based on a critical consensus 17 reviews.

The AllMusic review by James Christopher Monger awarded the album 3.5 stars stating "It's a melting pot to be sure, and the band has a tendency to go heavy on the atmosphere and light on the hooks, but there’s never any doubt that it’s a brew tended over by some awfully talented cooks." At Pitchfork, David Bevan wrote: "100 Lovers, with its interludes, clever sequencing, and the appropriately titled instrumental "Sunshine", feels less like a grouping of songs as it does an entirely different animal altogether." Melanie Haupt of The Austin Chronicle gave a four out of five stars, describing the instrumentation on the album "more lushly realized than ever." At Los Angeles Times, writer Randy Lewis explained: "DeVotchKa creates music that explodes with the desperate passion of someone standing at the end of a pier, or lost in the middle of a desert."

In a review for Paste, critic reviewer Steve LaBate wrote: "DeVotchKa's fifth studio LP, 100 Lovers, begins with a gorgeously moody and cinematic wash of synths, strings and piano seeping forth as if water through a crack in a dam. From beneath this swirl of sound, a steady-marching drumbeat subtly emerges, pressure building slowly at first but then more and more rapidly until, finally, the wall holding back the floodwaters bursts in a majestic symphonic crescendo."

Track listing

Personnel
 DeVotchKa:
 Vocals, guitar: Nick Urata
 Sousaphone: Jeanie Schroder
 Drums: Shawn King
 Piano: Thomas Hagerman
Strings:
Violin 1: Regan Kane
Violin 2: Takanori Sugishita
Violin 3: Ilya Goldberg
Viola 1: Summer Rhodes
Viola 2: Lisa Jablonowski
Cello 1: Charles Lee
Cello 2: Eleanor Wells
Wind
Bandoneon: Evan Orman
Tenor/Baritone Saxophone: Dan Sjogren
Trumpets
Chris Barron
Derek Banach
Jacob Valenzuela
Percussion
Mauro Refosco

Charts

References

2011 albums
Anti- (record label) albums
DeVotchKa albums